The 1951–52 season was the 68th Scottish football season in which Dumbarton competed at national level, entering the Scottish Football League, the Scottish Cup, the Scottish League Cup, the Supplementary Cup, and the Festival of Britain Quaich.  In addition Dumbarton competed in the Stirlingshire Cup.

Scottish League

Another slow start to the league campaign, with only a single win from 9 attempts, meant that Dumbarton were never seen as challengers for the title but improving performances during the season resulted in a mid-table 10th-place finish with 28 points, 16 behind champions Clyde.

Scottish Cup

In the Scottish Cup, Dumbarton lost to Falkirk in the third round.

Scottish League Cup

Qualification from the League Cup sectional games was again unfruitful, with Dumbarton finishing 4th and last, recording a win and a draw from their 6 games.

Supplementary Cup
After a year's absence, the Supplementary Cup returned for one last season, with Dumbarton reaching the second round before losing out to Alloa Athletic.

Festival of Britain St Mungo Quaich
The season started brightly, with Dumbarton winning their first national silverware in 41 years, by triumphing in the St Mungo Quaich - a competition for B Division sides to celebrate the Festival of Britain.

Stirlingshire Cup
In the Stirlingshire Cup, Falkirk defeated Dumbarton in the semi final.

Player statistics

Squad 

|}

Source:

International
Andy Tait and Duncan Smith were selected to play for the Scottish League B XI against the Irish League B side on 15 April 1952 - Smith scored one of the goals in the 6-0 win.

Transfers

Players in

Players out 

Source:

Reserve team
Dumbarton played a reserve team in Division C (South West) and finished 12th out of 16, recording 11 wins and 4 draws from 30 matches.  Note that in addition to the reserve sides of the bigger Division A teams in South and West Scotland, the first teams of East Stirlingshire (relegated from Division B three seasons previously) and Stranraer also competed in this league.

In the Second XI Cup, Dumbarton lost in the second round to Dundee United.

Finally in the Reserve League Cup, Dumbarton could only manage a win and a draw from their 6 sectional matches and failed to progress to the knock-out stages.

References

Dumbarton F.C. seasons
Scottish football clubs 1951–52 season